Elizabeth Gurley Flynn (August 7, 1890 – September 5, 1964) was an American labor leader, activist, and feminist who played a leading role in the Industrial Workers of the World (IWW). Flynn was a founding member of the American Civil Liberties Union and a visible proponent of women's rights, birth control, and women's suffrage. She joined the Communist Party USA in 1936 and late in life, in 1961, became its chairwoman. She died during a visit to the Soviet Union, where she was accorded a state funeral with processions in Red Square attended by over 25,000 people.

Background

Elizabeth Gurley Flynn was born on August 7, 1890, in Concord, New Hampshire, the daughter of Annie (Gurley) and Thomas Flynn. The family moved to New York in 1900, where she was educated at the local public schools. Her parents introduced her to socialism. When she was only fifteen she gave her first public speech, "What Socialism Will Do for Women," at the Harlem Socialist Club. As a result, she felt compelled to speak out for social change, making a decision she later regretted, to leave Morris High School before graduation. However, other sources state she was expelled from high school due to her political involvement.

Career

IWW (Wobblies)

In 1907, Flynn became a full-time organizer for the Industrial Workers of the World, and attended her first IWW convention in September of that year. Over the next few years she organized campaigns among garment workers in Pennsylvania, silk weavers in New Jersey, restaurant workers in New York, miners in Minnesota, Missoula, Montana, and Spokane, Washington; and textile workers in Massachusetts. During this period, author Theodore Dreiser described her as "an East Side Joan of Arc".

In 1909, Flynn participated in a free speech fight in Spokane, in which she chained herself to a lamp-post in order to delay her arrest. She later accused the police of using the jail as a brothel, an accusation that prompted them to try to confiscate all copies of the Industrial Worker reporting the charge.. On March 4, 1910, Spokane relented, giving the I.W.W. the right to hold speech meetings and letting all I.W.W. protestors free.

Flynn was arrested ten times during this period, but was never convicted of any criminal activity. It was a plea bargain that resulted in Flynn's expulsion from the IWW in 1916, along with fellow organizer Joe Ettor. According to historian Robert M. Eleff, three Minnesota miners had been arrested on murder charges arising from an incident which arose when a group of deputised mine guards, including an alleged gunman named James C. Myron and a former bouncer named Nick Dillon, came to the residence of one of the miners, Philip Masonovitch, to investigate allegations of the presence of an illegal liquor still on the premises. A confrontation ensued in which Myron and a bystander were shot dead. According to Eleff, some witness testimony suggested that Myron was killed accidentally by one of his colleagues, who fired into the Masonovitch residence from outside, and that the bystander was killed by Dillon. Three IWW organizers were also charged, although all three were elsewhere at the time. Head of the IWW's organizing committee, Bill Haywood seemed confident that Judge Hilton, who had successfully defended George Pettibone when he and Haywood were on trial in Idaho, could win the case for the miners.

However, the main organizers on the scene accepted an arrangement by which the other organizers were allowed to go free, but the three miners, none of whom spoke English fluently, faced time in prison. There was also a mixup in the sentencing; a prior agreement for one year in prison was somehow changed in the courtroom to a sentence of five to 20 years. Haywood held Flynn and Ettor responsible for allowing the miners to plead guilty to charges that they probably did not understand. Haywood wrote in his autobiography that Flynn and Ettor's "part in the affair terminated their connection with the IWW." Haywood's biographer, Peter Carlson, wrote that Ettor left the IWW and that Flynn "remained in the union, but took pains to avoid Haywood and his supporters."

ACLU
A founding member of the American Civil Liberties Union (ACLU) in 1920, Flynn played a leading role in the campaign against the conviction of Sacco and Vanzetti. Flynn was particularly concerned with women's rights, supporting birth control and women's suffrage. Flynn also criticized the leadership of trade unions for being male-dominated and not reflecting the needs of women.

Between 1926 and 1936, Flynn lived in southwest Portland, Oregon, with birth control activist, suffragette, and Wobbly Marie Equi. Though Flynn was in poor health most of her time in Portland, she was an active and vocal supporter of the 1934 West Coast Longshore Strike. In 1939, Flynn was re-elected to the ACLU board; however, when Adolf Hitler and Josef Stalin signed a nonaggression pact in 1939, the ACLU expelled all Communist Party members from its ranks in 1940, including Flynn.

International Labor Defense 
From 1927-1930, Flynn chaired the International Labor Defense. During that time she was active in trying to free jailed labor organizers Thomas J. Mooney and Warren K. Billings.

CPUSA

In 1936, Flynn joined the Communist Party and wrote a feminist column for its journal, the Daily Worker. Two years later, she was elected to the national committee. Aforementioned, Flynn's membership in the Party led to her ouster from the board of the ACLU in 1940.

During World War II, she played an important role in the campaign for equal economic opportunity and pay for women and the establishment of day care centers for working mothers. In 1942, she ran for Congress at-large in New York and received 50,000 votes. In July 1948, a dozen leaders of the Communist Party were arrested and accused of violating the Smith Act by advocating the overthrow of the US government by force and violence. After they were convicted in the Foley Square trial they appealed to the Supreme Court, which upheld their conviction in Dennis v. United States; two justices wrote in dissent that they were convicted in violation of their Constitutional rights for engaging in activities protected by the First Amendment. 

Flynn launched a campaign for their release but, in June 1951, was herself arrested in the second wave of arrests and prosecuted under the Smith Act with sixteen other Communist Party members. They were accused of conspiring to "teach and advocate violent overthrow" of the government.  Original lawyers included: Abraham L. Pomerantz, Carol Weiss King, Victor Rabinowitz, Michael Begun, Harold I. Cammer, Mary Kaufman, Leonard Boudin, and Abraham Unger.  Later, they were relieved by O. John Rogge, gangster Frank Costello's lawyer George Wolf, William W. Kleinman, Joseph L. Delaney, Frank Serri, Osmond K. Fraenkel, Henry G. Singer, Abraham J. Gellinoff, Raphael P. Koenig, and Nicholas Atlas.  After a nine-month trial, she was found guilty and served two years in Federal Prison Camp, Alderson near Alderson, West Virginia. She later wrote a prison memoir, The Alderson Story: My Life as a Political Prisoner.

After her release from prison, Flynn resumed her activities for leftist and Communist causes. She ran for the New York City Council as a Communist in 1957, garnering a total of 710 votes.

Flynn became the first national chairwoman of the Communist Party of the United States in 1961.

Personal life and death

In 1907, Flynn met a Minnesota local organizer for the Industrial Workers of the World, J. A. Jones. He was sixteen years older than she, but Flynn stated in her autobiography, "I fell in love with him and we were married in January 1908." The union produced two sons, John Vincent who died a few days after birth, and Fred Flynn, born 19 May 1910 (he died in 1940).

Flynn died in the Soviet Union on September 5, 1964, at age 74.

The Soviet government gave Flynn a state funeral in Red Square with over 25,000 people attending. In accordance with her wishes, Flynn's remains were flown to the United States for burial in Chicago's Waldheim Cemetery, near the graves of Eugene Dennis, Bill Haywood, Emma Goldman, and the Haymarket Riot Martyrs.

Legacy

Flynn left her small estate (books, clothing, and furniture) to Dorothy Day's Catholic Worker house in New York city following her death. Flynn and Day first met in the 1910s and Flynn regularly sent old clothing and blankets to the New York Catholic Worker house.

Flynn's influence as an activist was far-reaching, and her exploits were commemorated in a popular ballad. A popular song, "The Rebel Girl", was written by labor activist and musician Joe Hill in honor of Flynn.

Flynn's statement at her trial in 1952 is listed as #87 in American Rhetoric's Top 100 Speeches of the 20th Century (listed by rank).

In popular culture
A fictionalized version of Flynn is depicted in John Updike's novel In the Beauty of the Lilies in which she is said to have had an affair with the anarchist Carlo Tresca, supported by Flynn's letters and memoir. Tresca had also had a relationship with Flynn's sister Bina, and was the father of her nephew, Peter D. Martin.

Flynn is also depicted in Jess Walter's novel The Cold Millions.

A New Hampshire historical marker honoring Flynn is due to be installed in her hometown of Concord.

Quotes
History has a long-range perspective. It ultimately passes stern judgment on tyrants and vindicates those who fought, suffered, were imprisoned, and died for human freedom, against political oppression and economic slavery.  We believe that the class struggle existing in society is expressed in the economic power of the master on the one side and the growing economic power of the workers on the other side meeting in open battle now and again, but meeting in continual daily conflict over which shall have the larger share of labor's product and the ultimate ownership of the means of life.

I fell in love with my country—its rivers, prairies, forests, mountains, cities and people. . . . It could be a paradise on earth if it belonged to the people, not to a small owning class. –Jess Walters' The Cold MillionsHeterodoxy has been an experience of unbroken delight to me! I treasure the friendships and stimulating association it has given me.

Works

Books and pamphlets
 Sabotage: The Conscious Withdrawal of the Workers' Industrial Efficiency. Cleveland, OH: IWW Publishing Bureau, 1916.
 Debs, Haywood, Ruthenberg, New York: Workers Library Publishers, 1939.
 I Didn't Raise My Boy to Be a Soldier — for Wall Street. New York: Workers Library Publishers, 1940.
 Earl Browder: The Man from Kansas. New York: Workers Library Publishers, 1941.
 Questions and Answers on the Browder Case. New York: Citizens' Committee to Free Earl Browder, 1941.
 Coal Miners and the War. New York: Workers Library Publishers, 1942.
 Women in the War. New York: Workers Library Publishers, 1942.
 Daughters of America: Ella Reeve Bloor, Anita Whitney. New York: Workers Library Publishers, 1942.
 Women Have a Date with Destiny. New York: Workers Library Publishers, 1944.
 Meet the Communists. New York: Communist Party, U.S.A., 1946.
 Woman's Place in the Fight for a Better World. New York, New Century Publishers, 1947.
 The Twelve and You: What Happens to Democracy is Your Business, Too! New York: New Century Publishers, 1948.
 Labor's Own William Z. Foster: A Communist's Fifty Years of Working-Class Leadership and Struggle. New York: New Century Publishers, 1949.
 Stool-Pigeon. New York: New Century Publishers, 1949.
 The Plot to Gag America. New York: New Century Publishers, 1950.
 A Message to All Women Communists from Elizabeth Gurley Flynn on Mother's Day, May, 1950. New York: National Women's Commission, Communist Party, U.S.A., 1950.
 Debs and Dennis, Fighters for Peace. New York: New Century Publishers, 1950.
 Elizabeth Gurley Flynn Speaks to the Court: Opening Statement to the Court and Statement in the Case of the Sixteen Smith Act Victims in the Trial at Foley Square, New York. New York: New Century Publishers, 1952.
 13 Communists Speak to the Court. New York: New Century Publishers, 1953.
 Communists and the People: Summation Speech to the Jury in the Second Foley Square Smith Act Trial of Thirteen Communist Leaders. New York, New Century Publishers, 1953.
 I Speak My Own Piece: Autobiography of "The Rebel Girl." New York: Masses and Mainstream 1955.
 An Appeal to Women. New York: Campaign Committee, People's Rights Party, 1955.
 Horizons of the Future for a Socialist America. New York: Communist Party, USA, 1959.
 Freedom Begins at Home. New York: New Century Publishers, 1961.
 Ben Davis on the McCarran Act at the Harvard Law Forum. by Benjamin J. Davis New York: Gus Hall-Benjamin Davis Defense Committee, 1962. (introduction)
 The Alderson Story: My Life as a Political Prisoner. New York: International Publishers, 1963.
 The McCarran Act, Fact and Fancy. New York: Gus Hall-Benjamin J. Davis Defense Committee, 1963.
 The Rebel Girl: An Autobiography, My First Life (1906-1926). New York: International Publishers, 1973. —Revised and amended edition of I Speak My Own Piece.
 Memories of the Industrial Workers of the World. New York: American Institute for Marxist Studies, 1977.

Articles
 "May 1st: The Sun of Tomorrow". New Masses, May 6, 1941.
 "Defend the Civil Rights of Communists!" The Communist. Vol. XVIII, No.12, December 1939.
 "Mine Eyes Have Seen the Glory". The Masses, May 2, 1939.
 "The Minnesota Trials". The Masses January, 1917.
 "Do You Believe in Patriotism?" The Masses, March 1916.

References

Further reading
 Lara Vapnek, Elizabeth Gurley Flynn: Modern American Revolutionary. New York: Routledge, 2015
 Caballero, Raymond. McCarthyism vs. Clinton Jencks. Norman: University of Oklahoma Press, 2019.
 Rosalyn Fraad Baxandall, Words on Fire: The Life and Writing of Elizabeth Gurley Flynn. Rutgers University Press, 1987.
 Helen C. Camp, Iron In Her Soul: Elizabeth Gurley Flynn and the American Left. Pullman, WA: Washington State University Press, 1995.
 Mary Anne Trasciatti, "Elizabeth Gurley Flynn, the Sacco-Vanzetti Case, and the Rise and Fall of the Liberal-Radical Alliance, 1920-1940," American Communist History, vol. 15, no. 2 (Aug. 2016), pp. 191–216.
Jess Walter, The Cold Millions. New York: HarperCollins, 2020

External links

 Sabotage, The Conscious Withdrawal of the Workers' Industrial Efficiency
 
 The Rebel Girl: A Remembrance–Reprint from the Communist Party USA's People's Weekly World
 
 
 The Papers of Elizabeth G. Flynn at Dartmouth College Library
 The Elizabeth Gurley Flynn Papers and The Elizabeth Gurley Flynn Photographs at Tamiment Library and Robert F. Wagner Labor Archives at New York University Special Collections

1890 births
1964 deaths
People from Concord, New Hampshire
Members of the Communist Party USA
American autobiographers
American feminist writers
American trade union leaders
American Marxists
Women Marxists
American political writers
American suffragists
People convicted under the Smith Act
Burials at Forest Home Cemetery, Chicago
Free speech activists
Industrial Workers of the World leaders
American Marxist writers
Women in New York (state) politics
American women trade unionists
American Civil Liberties Union people
Marxist feminists
American socialist feminists
American communists
American birth control activists
Women autobiographers
Communist women writers
20th-century American women writers
20th-century American non-fiction writers
American political women
American women non-fiction writers
Industrial Workers of the World members
Trade unionists from New Hampshire